Ramani Ammal also popularly known by her stage number Rockstar Ramani Ammal is an Indian folk and playback singer. She rose to prominence after taking part in a television reality show Zee Tamil's Sa Re Ga Ma Pa Seniors in 2017. She received the nickname "Rockstar" from the judges of the inaugural edition of the Sa Re Ga Ma Pa Seniors. She made her film debut as a playback singer in Kaadhal (2004).

Career 
Ramani Ammal was born in a middle-class family and had to sacrifice her studies due to the family background. She pursued her interest in music at her young age but became a house maid to earn an income. She has also sung songs at wedding functions to keep her interest in music alive. She worked as a house servant for most part of her career before gaining her first opportunity to croon a song in a film. She made her debut as a singer in the 2004 romantic drama film Kaadhal. She also crowned songs in Kathavarayan (2008), Thenavattu (2008) and Haridas (2013). However she didn't receive much film opportunities and went back to do house work as a servant.

In 2017, she made her television debut at the age of 63 with the reality TV show Sa Re Ga Ma Pa Seniors and subsequently became a popular household name for singing film songs mostly owing her passion towards veteran actor turned politician M. G. R. She was one of the top ten finalists of the show and also emerged as the 1st runners-up in the Grand Finale which happened on 15 April 2018. Following her success with Sa Re Ga Ma Pa, she received several film opportunities as a playback singer and crooned songs for Junga (2018), Sandakozhi 2 (2018), Kaappaan (2019) and Nenjamundu Nermaiyundu Odu Raja (2019). She also conducted concerts in Sri Lanka, Singapore and United States.

In 2018, she also made a special appearance in one episode in television soap opera Yaaradi Nee Mohini.

Discography

As actor
Bommai Nayagi (2023)

References 

1954 births
Living people
Tamil playback singers
Indian women playback singers
Singers from Tamil Nadu
20th-century Indian singers
21st-century Indian singers
Indian women folk singers
Indian folk singers
Musicians from Madurai
20th-century Indian women singers
21st-century Indian women singers
Women musicians from Tamil Nadu